Spatzenhausen is a municipality in the district of Garmisch-Partenkirchen, in Bavaria, Germany.

References

Garmisch-Partenkirchen (district)